Uppuluri Ganapathi Sastry (1888–1989) was an Indian sanskrit scholar, writer and spiritual teacher, known for his scholarship in Vedas. He was the author of Veda Sara Ratnavali, a text on Vedas.

Ganapathi Sastry was born on 16 December 1888 at Kakinada in the south Indian state of Andhra Pradesh. Veda Sara Ratnavali, a two-part text on Vedas, was written for the Endowments Department of the Government of Andhra Pradesh. The Government of India awarded him the Padma Bhushan, the third highest civilian award, in 1985. Sastry died on 17 July 1989. Sri Vuppluri Ganapathi Sastry Veda Sastra Parishat (VGVP), a non-government organization for the propagation of vedas, is named after him.

References

External links
 
 

Recipients of the Padma Bhushan in literature & education
1898 births
1989 deaths
People from Kakinada
Indian centenarians
Indian Vedic scholars
Indian spiritual teachers
Indian spiritual writers
Telugu-language writers
Scholars from Andhra Pradesh